Carolyn Stewart is a popular radio presenter on U105, a station broadcasting in the Greater Belfast region of Northern Ireland.

Her broadcasting career began in 1990 when she was appointed one of the original DJs at the launch of Cool FM, sister station of Downtown Radio based in Newtownards, near Belfast. She was the original afternoon presenter with Cool FM and went on to work on many shows including the hugely successful Cool Goes Quiet, later to become Lights Out, which at that point was drawing more listeners than the breakfast show, which was then the biggest radio show of the day! Stewart stayed with Cool FM until 2005 when she was offered a frontline broadcasting role at new UTV-owned radio station U105.

One of Northern Ireland's most well-known broadcasters and club DJs, she has also worked in television on UTV, the regional channel for the Northern Ireland region of the ITV Network, co-presenting its Saturday morning youth show SUS with comedian Patrick Kielty in 1993.

Her current schedule on U105 is 12-3pm on week days. Stewart previously did her show later in the evening on week days. On her show she tackles a host of issues and helps with problems such as gardening and pet care.

References

U105
Her show tackles all current issues for the U105 listeners, by getting in experts in pet care, gardening, nutrition and money experts.

External links
U105 profile page
Facebook Fan Page

Irish women radio presenters
Radio personalities from Northern Ireland
Living people
Year of birth missing (living people)